

Codes

References

G